The Duplex is a 2015 Nigerian supernatural thriller film produced by Emma Isikaku and directed by Ikechukwu Onyeka. It stars Omoni Oboli, Mike Ezuruonye, Uru Eke and Anthony Monjaro.

The film revolves around the life of Emeka (Mike Ezuruonye), who is "on the edge of life" as he battles, not only to save his wife, Adaku (Omoni Oboli) and their unborn baby, but also his investment of ₦12 million, inadvertently, in a cemetery, glorified as a duplex".

Cast
Omoni Oboli as Adaku
Mike Ezuruonye as Emeka
Uru Eke as Dora
Anthony Monjaro as Jones
Ayo Umoh as Akpan
Maureen Okpoko as Seer

Release
The official trailer of The Duplex was released online in July 2014. The film was released in selected cinemas on 6 March 2015.

Critical reception
Amarachukwu Iwuala of 360Nobs panned everything about the film, stating: "There is really nothing the best cast in the world can do to a film, whose story and screening lack depth as we see in The Duplex. Rather, the half-baked work will drag them down to its level. Some film-makers should make a conscious effort to entertain rather than punish their viewers with trivial-round movies".

References

External links

English-language Nigerian films
2015 thriller drama films
2015 fantasy films
Nigerian thriller films
Nigerian supernatural films
Nigerian fantasy films
Nigerian drama films
2010s supernatural thriller films
2015 drama films
2015 films
2010s English-language films